France Gagné is a paralympic athlete from Canada competing mainly in category F56 throwing events.

Biography
Gagné has competed in four paralympics, always in just the javelin and discus, excepting in Sydney in 2000, where he also competed in shot.  He has twice won silver in javelin, in 1996 and 2000 as well as a bronze in 2004 while in discus he won a silver in 1992 and a bronze in 2000 Summer Paralympics.

References

Athletes (track and field) at the 1992 Summer Paralympics
Athletes (track and field) at the 1996 Summer Paralympics
Athletes (track and field) at the 2000 Summer Paralympics
Athletes (track and field) at the 2004 Summer Paralympics
Living people
Paralympic track and field athletes of Canada
Paralympic bronze medalists for Canada
Paralympic silver medalists for Canada
Medalists at the 1992 Summer Paralympics
Medalists at the 1996 Summer Paralympics
Medalists at the 2000 Summer Paralympics
Medalists at the 2004 Summer Paralympics
Year of birth missing (living people)
Laval Rouge et Or athletes
Paralympic medalists in athletics (track and field)
Canadian male javelin throwers
Canadian male discus throwers
20th-century Canadian people
Wheelchair discus throwers
Wheelchair javelin throwers
Paralympic discus throwers
Paralympic javelin throwers